Colégio Miguel de Cervantes (CMC) is a Spanish international school, in Morumbi, São Paulo, Brazil. Founded in 1978, it serves levels infant education through ensino médio (senior high school/sixth form college). The Asociación Colegio Español de São Paulo (ACESP) operates the centre.

See also
 Brazil–Spain relations
 Spanish immigration to Brazil
 Brazilians of Spanish descent

References

External links
  Colégio Miguel de Cervantes

Brazil–Spain relations
International schools in São Paulo
Spanish international schools
1978 establishments in Brazil
Educational institutions established in 1978
Miguel de Cervantes